The West Coast Main Line is a major trunk railway in the United Kingdom, linking London with Glasgow. The Watford DC lines are intricately linked with the southern part of the WCML and are also shown in full. A detailed diagram of the line is housed on this page for technical reasons. Note that some complex areas have been simplified for clarity.

Where dates for a railway station are shown as e.g. (1853–1959/1964) these refer to the dates of closure to passengers and freight.

Sources
 
 
 
 
 
 

Standard gauge railways in England
Standard gauge railways in Scotland
Rail transport in London
Rail transport in Hertfordshire
Rail transport in Buckinghamshire
Rail transport in Northamptonshire
Rail transport in Warwickshire
Rail transport in Staffordshire
Rail transport in Shropshire
Rail transport in Cheshire
Rail transport in Greater Manchester
Rail transport in Lancashire
Rail transport in Cumbria
Rail transport in Scotland